Trachycentra is a small genus of the fungus moth family, Tineidae. Therein, it belongs to the subfamily Hapsiferinae.

With eleven known species, this is one of the smaller genera of fungus moths:
 Trachycentra amphiloxa Meyrick, 1907
 Trachycentra calamias Meyrick, 1886
 Trachycentra chlorogramma Meyrick, 1907 (= T. aulacitis)
 Trachycentra cicatricosa Meyrick, 1922
 Trachycentra corethrodes (A.N.Diakonoff, 1968)
 Trachycentra elaeotropha Meyrick, 1933
 Trachycentra glaucias Meyrick, 1907
 Trachycentra prasina (A.N.Diakonoff, 1968)
 Trachycentra psorodes Meyrick, 1907
 Trachycentra rhynchitis Meyrick, 1938
 Trachycentra sagmatias Meyrick, 1907

Footnotes

References
  [2011]: Global Taxonomic Database of Tineidae (Lepidoptera). Retrieved 2011-DEC-22.

Hapsiferinae